Heini Salonen (born 11 July 1993 in Helsinki) is a Finnish tennis player.

Salonen has a 1–8 record for Finland in Fed Cup competition.

Fed Cup participation

Singles

Doubles

References

External links 
 
 
 

1993 births
Living people
Sportspeople from Helsinki
Finnish female tennis players
Boston College Eagles women's tennis players
20th-century Finnish women
21st-century Finnish women